Niolamia is an extinct genus of South American meiolaniid turtle. Arthur Smith Woodward classified it as being in the genus Meiolania, which this genus name is an anagram of, but this was not accepted by later authors. The genus is known from the Sarmiento Formation in Argentina. Crossochelys was found to be a synonym in a review of South American Turtles.

References

Further reading 
 Turtles, Tortoises and Terrapins: Survivors in Armor by Ronald Orenstein (Pg. 43)
 Wildlife of Gondwana: Dinosaurs and Other Vertebrates from the Ancient Supercontinent (Life of the Past) by Pat Vickers Rich, Thomas Hewitt Rich, Francesco Coffa, and Steven Morton

Meiolaniformes
Prehistoric turtle genera
Eocene turtles
Prehistoric turtles of South America
Eocene reptiles of South America
Divisaderan
Mustersan
Casamayoran
Bartonian life
Lutetian life
Paleogene Argentina
Fossils of Argentina
Golfo San Jorge Basin
Fossil taxa described in 1899
Taxa named by Florentino Ameghino
Sarmiento Formation